The women's long jump at the 2019 World Athletics Championships was held at the Khalifa International Stadium in Doha, Qatar, from 5 to 6 October 2019.

Summary
Throughout the 2019 season, only 3 athletes were able to jump over 7 metres, led by Malaika Mihambo who had been there in 6 out of 10 competitions.  One of the others was defending champion Brittney Reese, who didn't make it out of the qualifying round, leaving Ese Brume as Mihambo's strongest challenger.

On the first jump of the competition, Brume jumped 6.83m, then third up Maryna Bekh-Romanchuk came close to Brume with a 6.81m.  At the end of the round, Abigail Irozuru jumped 6.64m to take over third place.  Brume opened the second round by expanding her lead with a 6.91m.  After two rounds Mihambo was languishing in seventh place with a 6.52m, which would ultimately prove to be inadequate to qualify for the final three jumps.  On her third jump she went .  It was her personal best and more than 20 cm beyond the personal best of everyone else in the field.  Later in the competition, she had two more jumps that would have won the competition, the last equalling her previous world leading jump 7.16m.  Those standings remained until near the end of the fifth round when Bekh-Romanchuk jumped 6.92m to take silver by a centimetre.

Records
Before the competition records were as follows:

Schedule
The event schedule, in local time (UTC+3), was as follows:

Results

Qualification
Qualification: Qualifying Performance 6.75 (Q) or at least 12 best performers (q) advanced to the final.

Final
The final was started on 6 October at 19:16.

References

Long jump
Long jump at the World Athletics Championships